The men's 10 kilometres walk event at the 1952 Summer Olympic Games took place July 24 and July 27.  The final was won by Swede John Mikaelsson, who won the event four years prior in 1948.  This was the last time this event took place and was replaced by the 20 kilometres walk in 1956.

Results

Heats
The first round was held on July 24. The first six athletes from each heat advanced to the final.

Heat 1

Heat 2

Final

Key: DSQ = Disqualified, OR = Olympic record

References

Athletics at the 1952 Summer Olympics
Racewalking at the Olympics
Men's events at the 1952 Summer Olympics